Oliva australis is a species of sea snail, a marine gastropod mollusk in the family Olividae, the olives.

Subspecies
 Oliva australis australis Duclos, 1835
 Oliva australis pallescens Petuch & Sargent, 1986

Description

Distribution
This marine species was found in the Atlantic Ocean off the islands Saint Pierre and Miquelon.

References

 Vervaet F.L.J. (2018). The living Olividae species as described by Pierre-Louis Duclos. Vita Malacologica. 17: 1-111

External links
 Duclos, P. L. (1835-1840). Histoire naturelle générale et particulière de tous les genres de coquilles univalves marines a l'état vivant et fossile publiée par monographie. Genre Olive. Paris: Institut de France. 33 plates: pls 1-12

australis
Gastropods described in 1835